Oxycheila is a genus of beetles in the family Cicindelidae, containing the following species:

 Oxycheila affinis W. Horn, 1900
 Oxycheila aquatica Guerin-Meneville, 1843
 Oxycheila barkleyi Wiesner, 1999
 Oxycheila binotata Gray, 1832
 Oxycheila bolivari W. Horn, 1897
 Oxycheila brzoskai Wiesner, 1999
 Oxycheila buestani Wiesner, 1999
 Oxycheila chabrillacii Thomson, 1857
 Oxycheila chaudoiri W. Horn, 1894
 Oxycheila chestertonii Bates, 1872
 Oxycheila cophognatoides W. Horn, 1913
 Oxycheila costaricana Huber & Brzoska, 2000
 Oxycheila distigma Gory, 1831
 Oxycheila femoralis Castelnau, 1833
 Oxycheila fleutiauxi W. Horn, 1898
 Oxycheila germaini Fleutiaux, 1893
 Oxycheila glabra Waterhouse, 1880
 Oxycheila gracillima Bates, 1872
 Oxycheila gratiosa Bates, 1874
 Oxycheila haenschi W. Horn, 1900
 Oxycheila howdeni Br. van Nidek, 1980
 Oxycheila immaculata W. Horn, 1913
 Oxycheila ingridae Wiesner, 1999
 Oxycheila labiata Brulle, 1837
 Oxycheila lucasi W. Horn, 1893
 Oxycheila nigroaenea Bates, 1872
 Oxycheila oberthueri W. Horn, 1896
 Oxycheila obscura Wiesner, 1999
 Oxycheila opacipennis Waterhouse, 1889
 Oxycheila oxyoma Chaudoir, 1848
 Oxycheila pearsoni Wiesner, 1999
 Oxycheila pinelii Guerin-Meneville, 1843
 Oxycheila plaumanni Mandl, 1963
 Oxycheila pochoni Mandl, 1953
 Oxycheila polita Bates, 1872
 Oxycheila pseudoaquatica Wiesner, 1999
 Oxycheila pseudofemoralis W. Horn, 1938
 Oxycheila pseudoglabra Wiesner, 1999
 Oxycheila pseudonigroaenea W. Horn, 1938
 Oxycheila pseudostrandi Wiesner, 1999
 Oxycheila schmalzi W. Horn, 1896
 Oxycheila similis W. Horn, 1892
 Oxycheila strandi W. Horn, 1913
 Oxycheila tristis (Fabricius, 1775)
 Oxycheila weyrauchi Mandl, 1967
 Oxycheila wittmeri Wiesner, 1981

References

Cicindelidae